Pingale Devidas Anandrao (born 12 March 1961) is a member of the 14th Lok Sabha of India. He represents the Nashik constituency of Maharashtra and is a member of the Nationalist Congress Party (NCP) political party.

External links
 Official biographical sketch in Parliament of India website

Living people
1961 births
People from Maharashtra
India MPs 2004–2009
Marathi politicians
Nationalist Congress Party politicians from Maharashtra
People from Nashik
Lok Sabha members from Maharashtra